Marty Fields (born 18 December 1961)  is an Australian comedian, host/mc, actor, writer, musician, singer, and radio presenter from Melbourne.

Professional career 
The son of Australian actors Maurie Fields and Val Jellay, Fields has had long-running roles on Hey Hey It's Saturday, Blue Heelers, Blankety Blanks and various other television shows. He starred in over a dozen musicals including Guys and Dolls, High Society and Crazy for You, receiving a Green Room award for best actor in a musical. He has performed extensively around the world including shows at The Riviera (Las Vegas), The New York Comedy Club (NYC), and Howl at the Moon (Chicago).

Fields has worked alongside performers including Marina Prior, Jimeoin, and John Farnham. He has written two TV comedy shows and many newspaper and magazine articles, and is the creator and composer of the Australian musical The Paradise. Fields has also been an occasional presenter on 3AW's Nightline, filling in for Bruce Mansfield or Philip Brady.

Personal life 
Fields is based in Melbourne, where he lives with his wife and daughter. He is a patron of the Lost Dogs Home, and an ambassador of the Melbourne Storm.

References

External links
 Marty Fields Home Page
 Live performance clip:

Living people
Australian male musical theatre actors
Australian stand-up comedians
Australian male television actors
Australian television writers
Comedians from Melbourne
Australian male television writers
1961 births